Susan Paddon is a Canadian poet. Her debut collection Two Tragedies in 429 Breaths, published in 2015, was a finalist for the Raymond Souster Award and the ReLit Award for Poetry, and won the J. M. Abraham Poetry Award.

Originally from St. Thomas, Ontario, she attended McGill University and Concordia University in Montreal. She currently resides in Margaree, Nova Scotia.

References

21st-century Canadian poets
Canadian women poets
People from St. Thomas, Ontario
Writers from Ontario
Writers from Nova Scotia
Concordia University alumni
McGill University alumni
Living people
21st-century Canadian women writers
Year of birth missing (living people)